AD 53 (LIII) was a common year starting on Monday (link will display the full calendar) of the Julian calendar. At the time, it was known as the Year of the Consulship of Silanus and Antonius (or, less frequently, year 806 Ab urbe condita). The denomination AD 53 for this year has been used since the early medieval period, when the Anno Domini calendar era became the prevalent method in Europe for naming years.

Events

By place

Roman Empire 
 Emperor Claudius removes Herod Agrippa II from the tetrarchy of Chalcis in Greece.
 Decimus Junius Silanus Torquatus and Quintus Haterius Antoninus become Roman consuls. 
 Claudius secures a senatorial decree that gives jurisdiction in financial cases to imperial procurators.  This marks a significant strengthening of imperial powers at the expense of the Senate.
 June 9 – Nero is adopted by Claudius as his son and marries his 14-year-old daughter Claudia Octavia. 
 Claudius accepts Nero as his successor, to the detriment of Britannicus, his son by his first wife, Valeria Messalina.
 Distinct fellowships within the reign of Centricles fall to the dominion of Gaulic barbarians, which provoke an enclave uprising in the foothills of what are now the Alps.
 Cardiff is founded by Aulus Didius Gallus.

Korea 
 Taejodae becomes ruler of the kingdom of Goguryeo.

By topic

Religion 
 Evodius succeeds Saint Peter as Patriarch of Antioch.
 Paul writes his epistle to Galatians from Efessos (approximately date)

Arts and sciences 
 Seneca writes the tragedy Agamemnon, which he intends to be read as the last chapter of a trilogy including two of his other tragedies, Medea and Edipus.

Births 
 September 18 – Marcus Ulpius Traianus, Roman emperor (d. 117)
 Domitia Longina, Roman empress (approximate date)
 Kanishka I, Indian ruler of the Kushan Empire (d. 150)

Deaths 

Mobon, Korean ruler of Goguryeo

References 

0053